Mountougoula  is a village and rural commune in the Cercle of Kati in the Koulikoro Region of south-western Mali. The commune covers an area of 369 square kilometers and includes 16 villages. In the 2009 census the commune had a population of 11,814. The village of Mountougoula lies 30 km southeast of Bamako, the Malian capital.

References

External links
.

Communes of Koulikoro Region